Sue de Beer (born September 8, 1973) is a contemporary artist who lives and works in New York City. De Beer's work is located at the intersection of film, installation, sculpture, and photography, and she is primarily known for her large-scale film-installations.

Background

De Beer received a Bachelor of Fine Arts degree (BFA) from Parsons The New School for Design in New York in 1995 and a Master of Fine Arts (MFA) from Columbia University in 1998.

Early life and education

De Beer was raised in New England, and lives in New York City. She cites the aesthetic of 1700 and 1900 New England as an early influence on her work:

Growing up in a rambling Victorian house with a widow's walk in Salem, Mass., which still exudes an air of its witchy past, she felt that mysticism was a kind of birthright, and it has been a more prominent element of her work in recent years. Ms. de Beer has also borrowed from the dark, violent post-religious mysticism of the novelist Dennis Cooper. (From his novel "Period," used in a 2005 de Beer video: "I could open the other dimension right now if I wanted. Or I could stay here with you. I'm kind of like a god.") 

Time itself is the most often repeated subject of de Beer's work, emerging from images and ideas related to the passage of time. Ghosts, haunting, adolescence, trace memory and erasure find a common ground within this theme.

Ms. de Beer said that her fascination with ghosts is in one sense simply about finding a way to explore how we all must deal with the past and with loss as we grow older, a struggle that finds a metaphor in the artistic process itself.

De Beer lived in Berlin, Germany between 2002-2008. She produced and shot three films in Berlin: 'Hans & Grete' (2003), 'Black Sun' (2005), and 'the Quickening' (2006).

Works

 Hans & Grete
 Disappear Here
 Black Sun
 The Quickening
 Permanent Revolution
 The Ghosts
 Haunt Room
 The Blue Lenses

Career

Her work has been the subject of several major solo exhibitions including "Hans & Grete", at the Kunst-Werke, Berlin, "Black Sun", at the Whitney Museum of American Art at Altria, "Permanent Revolution" at the MuHKA Museum in Antwerp, Belgium, and "the Ghosts" at the Park Avenue Armory in New York. She has exhibited widely in the United States and abroad at venues including but not limited to the New Museum of Contemporary Art, the Whitney Museum of American Art, MoMA PS1, the Brooklyn Museum, the Park Avenue Armory, and Marianne Boesky Gallery in New York, Los Angeles Contemporary Exhibitions in Los Angeles, the Reina Sofia in Madrid, the Kunst-Werke, the Zentrum für Kunst und Medientechnologie, and the Schirn Kunsthalle Frankfurt in Germany, the Neue Galerie am Landesmuseum Joanneum in Graz, Austria, the MuHKA Museum in Antwerp, Belgium, and the Museum of Modern Art, Busan, in Busan, South Korea.

De Beer's work has been associated with New Gothic Art.

De Beer is an Associate Professor in the Art Department of New York University | Steinhardt.

Solo exhibitions

 2015 "The Blue Lenses", Marianne Boesky Gallery East, New York
 2012 "The Ghosts", Galerie Christian Ehrentraut, Berlin, Germany
 2011 "Silver and Gold", Marfa Texas, curated by Shamim Momin / LAND
 2011 "Haunt Room", the High Line, New York
 2011 "The Ghosts", Park Avenue Armory, New York, curated by Art Production Fund
 2011 "Depiction of a Star Obscured by Another Figure", Marianne Boesky Gallery, New York
 2008 Sue de Beer & Delia Gonzalez: "Ghost Polaroid Graveyard", The Forgotten Bar, Berlin
 2008 "Permanent Revolution", Museum of Modern Art, Antwerp, curated by Dieter Roelstraete
 2008 "Zoetropes", Marianne Boesky Gallery at the Dark Fair, The Swiss Institute, New York.
 2007 "Permanent Revolution", Arndt and Partner, Berlin
 2007 "Permanent Revolution", Sandroni Rey Gallery, Los Angeles
 2006 "The Quickening", Marianne Boesky Gallery, New York
 2005 "The Stills", Sandroni Rey Gallery, Los Angeles
 2005 "Black Sun", Whitney Museum of American Art at Altria, New York, curated by Shamim Momin
 2004 "The Dark Hearts", Sandroni Rey Gallery at Statements, Basel, Miami
 2003 "Hans & Grete", Kunst Werke, Berlin
 2003 "Hans & Grete", Postmasters Gallery, New York
 2002 "Photographs", Kunstlerhaus Bethanien, Berlin
 2001 "Photographs / project room: Ghost Stories Magazine", Sandroni Rey Gallery, Los Angeles
 2000 Sue de Beer & Laura Parnes: "Heidi 2", Los Angeles Contemporary Exhibitions, Los Angeles
 2000 Sue de Beer & Laura Parnes: "Heidi 2", Deitch Projects, New York

References

External links
 Sue de Beer Official Website
 Randy Kennedy, New York Times: "White Paint, Chocolate and Postmodern Ghosts".  New York Times Feature on Sue de Beer's the Ghosts.
 Sue de Beer at Marianne Boesky Gallery
 Sue de Beer, Permanent Collection of the Museum of Modern Art
 Sue de Beer, Permanent Collection of the Whitney Museum of American Art
 Vimeo. Sue de Beer's vimeo channel

1973 births
Living people
Parsons School of Design alumni
Columbia University School of the Arts alumni
Steinhardt School of Culture, Education, and Human Development faculty
Academic staff of European Graduate School
American video artists
American installation artists
American photographers
American women artists
American women academics
21st-century American women